De Bello Civili (On the Civil War), more commonly referred to as the Pharsalia, is a Roman epic poem written by the poet Lucan, detailing the civil war between Julius Caesar and the forces of the Roman Senate led by Pompey the Great. The poem's title is a reference to the Battle of Pharsalus, which occurred in 48 BC, near Pharsalus, Thessaly, in northern Greece. Caesar decisively defeated Pompey in this battle, which occupies all of the epic's seventh book. In the early twentieth century, translator J. D. Duff, while arguing that "no reasonable judgment can rank Lucan among the world's great epic poets", notes that the work is notable for Lucan's decision to eschew divine intervention and downplay supernatural occurrences in the events of the story. Scholarly estimation of Lucan's poem and poetry has since changed, as explained by commentator Philip Hardie in 2013: "In recent decades, it has undergone a thorough critical re-evaluation, to re-emerge as a major expression of Neronian politics and aesthetics, a poem whose studied artifice enacts a complex relationship between poetic fantasy and historical reality."

Origins
The poem was begun around 61 AD and several books were in circulation before the Emperor Nero and Lucan had a bitter falling out. Lucan continued to work on the epic – despite Nero's prohibition against any publication of Lucan's poetry – and it was left unfinished when Lucan was compelled to suicide as part of the Pisonian conspiracy in 65 AD. In total, ten books were written and all survive; the tenth book breaks off abruptly with Caesar in Egypt.

Contents

Book 1: After a brief introduction lamenting the idea of Romans fighting Romans and an ostensibly flattering dedication to Nero, the narrative summarizes background material leading up to the present war and introduces Caesar in northern Italy. Despite an urgent plea from the Spirit of Rome to lay down his arms, Caesar crosses the Rubicon, rallies his troops and marches south to Rome, joined by Curio along the way.  The book closes with panic in the city, terrible portents and visions of the disaster to come.

Book 2: In a city overcome by despair, an old veteran presents a lengthy interlude regarding the previous civil war that pitted Marius against Sulla. Cato the Younger is introduced as a heroic man of principle; as abhorrent as civil war is, he argues to Brutus that it is better to fight than do nothing. After siding with Pompey—the lesser of two evils—he remarries his ex-wife, Marcia, and heads to the field. Caesar continues south through Italy and is delayed by Domitius' brave resistance. He attempts a blockade of Pompey at Brundisium, but the general makes a narrow escape to Greece.

Book 3: As his ships sail, Pompey is visited in a dream by Julia, his dead wife and Caesar's daughter. Caesar returns to Rome and plunders the city, while Pompey reviews potential foreign allies. Caesar then heads for Spain, but his troops are detained at the lengthy siege of Massilia (Marseille). The city ultimately falls in a bloody naval battle.

Book 4: The first half of this book is occupied with Caesar's victorious campaign in Spain against Afranius and Petreius. Switching scenes to Pompey, his forces intercept a raft carrying Caesarians, who prefer to kill each other rather than be taken prisoner. The book concludes with Curio launching an African campaign on Caesar's behalf, where he is defeated and slain by the African King Juba.

Book 5: The Senate in exile confirms Pompey the true leader of Rome. Appius consults the Delphic oracle to learn of his fate in the war, and leaves with a misleading prophecy. In Italy, after defusing a mutiny, Caesar marches to Brundisium and sails across the Adriatic to meet Pompey's army. Only a portion of Caesar's troops complete the crossing when a storm prevents further transit; he tries to personally send a message back but is himself nearly drowned. Finally, the storm subsides, and the armies face each other at full strength. With battle at hand, Pompey sends his wife to the island of Lesbos.

Book 6: Pompey's troops force Caesar's armies – featuring the heroic centurion Scaeva – to fall back to Thessaly. Lucan describes the wild Thessalian terrain as the armies wait for battle the next day. The remainder of the book follows Pompey's son Sextus, who wishes to know the future. He finds the most powerful witch in Thessaly, Erichtho, and she reanimates the corpse of a dead soldier in a terrifying ceremony. The soldier predicts Pompey's defeat and Caesar's eventual assassination.

Book 7: The soldiers are pressing for battle, but Pompey is reluctant until Cicero convinces him to attack. The Caesarians are victorious, and Lucan laments the loss of liberty. Caesar is especially cruel as he mocks the dying Domitius and forbids cremation of the dead Pompeians. The scene is punctuated by a description of wild animals gnawing at the corpses, and a lament from Lucan for Thessalia, infelix – ill-fated Thessaly.

Book 8: Pompey himself escapes to Lesbos, reunites with his wife, then goes to Cilicia to consider his options. He decides to enlist aid from Egypt, but King Ptolemy is fearful of retribution from Caesar and plots to murder Pompey when he lands. Pompey suspects treachery; he consoles his wife and rows alone to the shore, meeting his fate with Stoic poise. His headless body is flung into the ocean, but washes up on shore and receives a humble burial from Cordus.

Book 9: Pompey's wife mourns her husband as Cato takes up leadership of the Senate's cause. He plans to regroup and heroically marches the army across Africa to join forces with King Juba, a trek that occupies most of the middle section of the book. On the way, he passes an oracle but refuses to consult it, citing Stoic principles. Caesar visits Troy and pays respects to his ancestral gods. A short time later he arrives in Egypt; when Ptolemy's messenger presents him with the head of Pompey, Caesar feigns grief to hide his joy at Pompey's death.

Book 10: Caesar arrives in Egypt, where he is beguiled by the Ptolemy's sister Cleopatra. A banquet is held; Pothinus, Ptolemy's cynical and bloodthirsty chief minister, plots an assassination of Caesar but is killed in his surprise attack on the palace. A second attack comes from Ganymede, an Egyptian noble, and the poem breaks off abruptly as Caesar is fighting for his life.

Completeness

Almost all scholars agree that the Pharsalia as we now have it is unfinished. Some debate exists, however, as to whether the poem was unfinished at the time of Lucan's death, or if the final few books of the work were lost at some point. Braund notes that little evidence has been found one way or the other, and that this question must "remain a matter of speculation." Some argue that Lucan intended to end his poem with the Battle of Philippi (42 BC) or the Battle of Actium (31 BC). Both these hypotheses seem unlikely, as they would have required Lucan to pen a work many times larger than what is extant: For instance, the ten-book poem we have today covers a total time of twenty months; were the poet to have continued this pace, his work would cover a time span of six to seventeen years, which scholars consider unlikely. An alternative considered "more attractive" by Susanna Braund, is that Lucan intended for his poem to be sixteen books long and to end with the assassination of Caesar. This theory, too, has its problems, namely that Lucan would have been required to introduce and rapidly develop characters to replace Pompey and Cato. It also might have given the work a "happy ending", which seems inconsistent, tonally, with the poem as a whole. Ultimately, Braund argues that the best hypothesis is that Lucan's original intent was a twelve-book poem, mirroring the length of the Aeneid. The best internal argument for this is that in his sixth book Lucan features a necromantic ritual that parallels and inverts many of the motifs found in Virgil's sixth book (which details Aeneas' consultation with the Sibyl and his subsequent descent into the underworld). Had the book been extended to twelve books, Braund contends that it would have ended with the death of Cato, and his subsequent apotheosis as a Stoic hero.

Conversely, the Latinist Jamie Masters argues the opposite, that the finale of Book 10 is indeed the ending to the work as Lucan intended. Masters devotes an entire chapter to this hypothesis in his book Poetry and Civil War in Lucan's Bellum Civile (1992), arguing that by being open-ended and ambiguous, the poem's conclusion avoids "any kind of resolution, but [still] preserves the unconventional premises of its subject-matter: evil without alternative, contradiction without compromise, civil war without end".

Title
The poem is popularly known as the Pharsalia, largely due to lines 985986 in Book 9, which read, Pharsalia nostra / Vivet ("Our Pharsalia shall live on"). However, many scholars, such as J. D. Duff and Braund, note that this is a recent name given to the work, and that the earliest manuscripts of the poem refer to it as De Bello Civili (Concerning the Civil War). Braund further argues that calling the poem Pharsalia "excessively ... privilege[s] ... an episode which occupies only one book and occurs in the centre of the poem, rather than at its climax."

Style
Lucan is heavily influenced by Latin poetic tradition, most notably Ovid's Metamorphoses and of course Virgil's Aeneid, the work to which the Pharsalia is most naturally compared. Lucan frequently appropriates ideas from Virgil's epic and "inverts" them to undermine their original, heroic purpose. Sextus' visit to the Thracian witch Erichtho provides an example; the scene and language clearly reference Aeneas' descent into the underworld (also in Book VI), but while Virgil's description highlights optimism toward the future glories of Rome under Augustan rule, Lucan uses the scene to present a bitter and gory pessimism concerning the loss of liberty under the coming empire.

Like all Silver Age poets, Lucan received the rhetorical training common to upper-class young men of the period. The suasoria – a school exercise where students wrote speeches advising an historical figure on a course of action – no doubt inspired Lucan to compose some of the speeches found in the text. Lucan also follows the Silver Age custom of punctuating his verse with short, pithy lines or slogans known as sententiae, a rhetorical tactic used to grab the attention of a crowd interested in oratory as a form of public entertainment. Quintilian singles out Lucan as a writer clarissimus sententiis – "most famous for his sententiae", and for this reason magis oratoribus quam poetis imitandus – "(he is) to be imitated more by orators than poets". His style makes him unusually difficult to read.

Finally, in another break with Golden Age literary techniques, Lucan is fond of discontinuity. He presents his narrative as a series of discrete episodes often without any transitional or scene-changing lines, much like the sketches of myth strung together in Ovid's Metamorphoses. The poem is more naturally organized on principles such as aesthetic balance or correspondence of scenes between books rather than the need to follow a story from a single narrative point of view. Lucan was considered among the ranks of Homer and Virgil.

Themes

Horrors of civil war
Lucan emphasizes the despair of his topic in the poem's first seven lines (the same length as the opening to Virgil's Aeneid):

Events throughout the poem are described in terms of insanity and sacrilege. Far from glorious, the battle scenes are portraits of bloody horror, where nature is ravaged to build terrible siege engines and wild animals tear mercilessly at the flesh of the dead.

Flawed characters
Most of the main characters featured in the Pharsalia are terribly flawed and unattractive. Caesar, for instance, is presented as a successful military leader, but he strikes fear into the hearts of people and is extremely destructive. Lucan conveys this by using a simile (Book 1, lines 1517) that compares Caesar to a thunderbolt:

Throughout the Pharsalia, this simile holds, and Caesar is continuously depicted as an active force, who strikes with great power.

Pompey, on the other hand, is old and past his prime, and years of peacetime have turned him soft. Susanna Braund argues that Lucan "has taken the weaker, essentially human, elements of Aeneas' characterAeneas doubting his mission, Aeneas as husband and loverand bestowed them upon Pompey." And while this portrays the leader as indecisive, slow to action, and ultimately ineffective, it does make him the only main character shown to have any sort of "emotional life." What is more, Lucan at times explicitly roots for Pompey. But nevertheless, the leader is doomed in the end. Lucan compares Pompey to a large oak-tree (Book 1, lines 13643), which is still quite magnificent due to its size but on the verge of tipping over:

By comparing Caesar to a bolt of lightning, and Pompey to a large tree on the verge of death, Lucan poetically implies early on in the Pharsalia that Caesar will strike and fell Pompey.

The grand exception to this generally bleak depiction of characters is Cato, who stands as a Stoic ideal in the face of a world gone mad (he alone, for example, refuses to consult oracles to know the future).  Pompey also seems transformed after Pharsalus, becoming a kind of stoic martyr; calm in the face of certain death upon arrival in Egypt, he receives virtual canonization from Lucan at the start of book IX.  This elevation of Stoic and Republican principles is in sharp contrast to the ambitious and imperial Caesar, who becomes an even greater monster after the decisive battle.  Even though Caesar wins in the end, Lucan makes his sentiments known in the famous line Victrix causa deis placuit sed Victa Catoni – "The victorious cause pleased the gods, but the vanquished [cause] pleased Cato."

Anti-imperialism
Given Lucan's clear anti-imperialism, the flattering Book I dedication to Nero – which includes lines like multum Roma tamen debet ciuilibus armis | quod tibi res acta est – "But Rome is greater by these civil wars, because it resulted in you" – is somewhat puzzling.  Some scholars have tried to read these lines ironically, but most see it as a traditional dedication written at a time before the (supposed) true depravity of Lucan's patron was revealed.  The extant "Lives" of the poet support this interpretation, stating that a portion of the Pharsalia was in circulation before Lucan and Nero had their falling out.

Furthermore, according to Braund, Lucan's negative portrayal of Caesar in the early portion of the poem was not likely meant as criticism of Nero, and it may have been Lucan's way of warning the new emperor about the issues of the past.

Treatment of the supernatural

Lucan breaks from epic tradition by minimizing, and in certain cases, completely ignoring (and some argue, denying) the existence of the traditional Roman deities. This is in marked contrast to his predecessors, Virgil and Ovid, who used anthropomorphized gods and goddesses as major players in their works. According to Susanna Braund, by choosing to not focus on the gods, Lucan emphasizes and underscores the human role in the atrocities of the Roman civil war. James Duff Duff, on the other hand, argues that "[Lucan] was dealing with Roman history and with fairly recent events; and the introduction of the gods as actors must have been grotesque".

This, however, is not to say that the Pharsalia is devoid of any supernatural phenomenon; in fact, quite the opposite is true, and Braund argues that "the supernatural in all its manifestations played a highly significant part in the structuring of the epic". Braund sees the supernatural as falling into two categories: "dreams and visions" and "portents, prophecies, and consultations of supernatural powers". In regards to the first category, the poem features four explicit and important dream and vision sequences: Caesar's vision of Roma as he is about to cross the Rubicon, the ghost of Julia appearing to Pompey, Pompey's dream of his happy past, and Caesar and his troops' dream of battle and destruction. All four of these dream-visions are placed strategically throughout the poem, "to provide balance and contrast". In regards to the second category, Lucan describes a number of portents, two oracular episodes, and Erichtho's necromantic rite. This manifestation of the supernatural is more public, and serves many purposes, including to reflect "Rome's turmoil on the supernatural plane", as well as simply to "contribute to the atmosphere of sinster foreboding" by describing disturbing rituals.

The poem as civil war
According to Jamie Masters, Lucan's Pharsalia is not just a poem about a civil war, but rather in a metaphorical way is a civil war. In other words, he argues that Lucan embraces the metaphor of internal discord and allows it to determine the way the story is told by weaving it into the fabric of the poem itself. Masters proposes that Lucan's work is both "Pompeian" (in the sense that it celebrates the memory of Pompey, revels in delay, and decries the horrors of civil war) and "Caesarian" (in the sense that it still recounts Pompey's death, eventually overcomes delay, and describes the horrors of war in careful detail). Because Lucan is on both of the characters' sides whilst also supporting neither, the poem is inherently at war with itself. Furthermore, because Lucan seems to place numerous obstacles before Caesar, he can be seen as opposing Caesar's actions. However, since Lucan still chooses to record them in song, hebeing the poet and thus the one who has the final say on what goes into his workis in some ways waging the war himself. Ultimately, Masters refers to the binary opposition that he sees throughout the entire poem as Lucan's "schizophrenic poetic persona".

Poetic representation of history
Though the Pharsalia is an historical epic, it would be wrong to think Lucan is only interested in the details of history itself.  As one commentator has pointed out, Lucan is more concerned "with the significance of events rather than the events themselves."

Influence

Lucan's work was popular in his own day and remained a school text in late antiquity and during the Middle Ages. Over 400 manuscripts survive; its interest to the court of Charlemagne is evidenced by the existence of five complete manuscripts from the 9th century. Dante includes Lucan among other classical poets in the first circle of the Inferno, and draws on the Pharsalia in the scene with Antaeus (a giant depicted in a story from Lucan's book IV).

Christopher Marlowe published a translation of Book I, while Thomas May followed with a complete translation into heroic couplets in 1626. May later translated the remaining books and wrote a continuation of Lucan's incomplete poem. The seven books of May's effort take the story through to Caesar's assassination.

The line Victrix causa deis placuit sed victa Catoni has been a favorite for supporters of "lost" causes over the centuries; it can be translated as "the winning cause pleased the gods, but the lost cause pleased Cato". One American example comes from the Confederate Memorial at Arlington National Cemetery, which has these words in Latin inscribed on its base. An English example is found in the speech of Viscount Radcliffe in the House of Lords adjudicating on a tax appeal.

The English poet and classicist A. E. Housman published a landmark critical edition of the poem in 1926.

Notes

References

Bibliography

Further reading

Translations

External links
Latin copies
 
Full text of the Pharsalia via The Latin Library
Full text of the Pharsalia with concordance tools via IntraText
Full text of the Pharsalia in English via The Medieval and Classical Literature Library
Housman's edition of the Pharsalia via HathiTrust
 

1st-century Latin books
Epic poems in Latin
Historical poems
Unfinished books
Unfinished literature completed by others
Ancient Thessaly
Macedonia (Roman province)
Caesar's civil war
Fictional depictions of Julius Caesar in literature
Fictional depictions of Cleopatra in literature
Cultural depictions of Pompey
Cultural depictions of Cato the Younger